Magazzino Italian Art is a museum and Research Center dedicated to advancing scholarship and public appreciation of postwar and contemporary Italian art in the United States. The museum was founded by Nancy Olnick and Giorgio Spanu with the mission to share works of the group of Italian artists who exhibited together in the late 1960s and early 1970s, affiliated with the art movement of Arte Povera, with American audiences. Magazzino opened to the public on June 28, 2017, with an exhibition dedicated to the influence and legacy of Margherita Stein, a late Italian dealer associated with artists active in Arte Povera circles and beyond. The museum is free and open to the public.

Magazzino Italian Art is located in Cold Spring, New York, within the Town of Philipstown on U.S. Route 9, on the former Cyberchron site. Magazzino, which means "warehouse" in Italian, consists of an old farmers’ warehouse (later turned into a dairy distribution center and then a computer factory) and a new building by Spanish architect Miguel Quismondo. The building includes a new exhibition space and a 5,000-volume library, making up the core of the Research Center, opened in 2018. 

Magazzino Italian Art became a non-for-profit museum in 2018, operated by Magazzino Italian Art Foundation.

History 
Husband-and-wife collectors Nancy Olnick and Giorgio Spanu, who were looking to share their collection with the public, founded Magazzino Italian Art in the summer of 2017. Vittorio Calabrese was appointed as the institution’s inaugural executive director.

Lifelong art enthusiasts, Olnick, who is from Manhattan, New York, and Spanu, who is from Sardinia, Italy, began their collection by assembling works by artists including Andy Warhol, Roy Lichtenstein, Ed Ruscha, George Segal, Jean Dubuffet, Max Ernst, Paul Klee, Henri Matisse, Joan Miró, Jackson Pollock and Pablo Picasso. Olnick and Spanu began their collection of Italian art and design with an interest in Murano Glass. The first piece they purchased was an hourglass by Paolo Venini. It was after this purchase that the couple pursued pieces of Murano Glass together, assembling one of the most distinctive collections in private hands over their 12 years of collecting. The collection was exhibited in 2000 for the exhibition Venetian Glass: 20th-Century Italian Glass From the Olnick Spanu Collection, at the Museum of Arts and Design. Including more than 250 works, the exhibition featured pieces of glass by Paolo Venini, Gio Ponti, Benvenuto Barovier, Carlo Scarpa, among others.

The couple shifted focus to the Arte Povera movement. This interest in Arte Povera began after a visit to Castello di Rivoli, a contemporary art museum in Turin that has a significant collection. The core of the Olnick Spanu Arte Povera collection came via Margherita Stein, a Turin-based collector who died in 2003, and other works were acquired at auction and from galleries. Nancy Olnick and Giorgio Spanu amassed one of the world’s premier collections of postwar Italian art. The collection contains more than 400 works compiled over the course of three decades.

From 2003 to 2015, the couple also ran the Olnick Spanu Art Program from their home designed by Spanish architect Alberto Campo Baeza in Garrison, New York that overlooks the Hudson River. The Olnick Spanu Art Program included contemporary Italian artists Giorgio Vigna, Massimo Bartolini, Mario Airò, Domenico Bianchi, Remo Salvadori, Stefano Arienti, Bruna Esposito, Marco Bagnoli, Francesco Arena, and Paolo Canevari, who created spite-specific work on the property.

In 2012, Olnick and Spanu had hoped to construct the space on their estate in Garrison, New York. However, they decided to relocate the museum to the Route 9 location in Cold Spring, New York in response to conversations with the local community.

Exhibitions 
Magazzino opened to the public on June 28, 2017 with an exhibition dedicated to the influence and legacy of Margherita Stein, a late Italian dealer associated with artists active in Arte Povera circles and beyond. The debut exhibition, Margherita Stein: Rebel with a Cause, detailed the history of the eponymous champion of Arte Povera, whose Galleria Christian Stein, founded in Turin in 1966, offered early shows to Alighiero Boetti, Lucio Fontana, Jannis Kounellis, and many others. The exhibition at Magazzino Italian Art eschewed a chronological overview that mirrored how Arte Povera evolved. Scholar Ara H. Merjian characterizes the movement as an "often-slippery phenomenon with both a lengthy prehistory and a protracted afterlife, exceeding any strictly confined dates or formal imperatives.” The exhibition included pieces that conveyed the range of Arte Povera’s engagements with materiality and phenomenological experience.

In 2018, Magazzino Italian Art opened a new exhibition that is ongoing, which focuses on Arte Povera. Including nearly 80 sculptures, paintings and photographs, the exhibition highlights works by Alighiero Boetti, Gilberto Zorio, Giovanni Anselmo, Giulio Paolini, Giuseppe Penone, Jannis Kounellis, Luciano Fabro, Mario Merz, Marisa Merz, Michelangelo Pistoletto, Pier Paolo Calzolari, Pino Pascali. Artworks are periodically rotated within the galleries.

In 2020, Magazzino began hosting rotating special exhibitions in Gallery 8: the large, sky-lit gallery space added on to the original structure of the renovated warehouse space by architect Miguel Quismondo. The first exhibition in Gallery 8, Homemade, was originally an online initiative created to support and engage Italian artists working at home in New York during the global pandemic. While beginning as a virtual and Instagram invitational, it evolved into a physical exhibition upon the museum’s reopening in July 2020. The exhibition included work by artists Alessandro Teoldi, Andrea Mastrovito, Beatrice Scaccia, Danilo Correale, Davide Balliano, Francesco Simeti, Luisa Rabbia and Maria D. Rapicavoli. With approximately 30 works on view, curated by Director Vittorio Calabrese with Chiara Mannarino, the exhibition demonstrated how artists pushed their practice during this period, using new methods and materials, and interrogating new issues—from concrete casts that explore polarized concepts, such as connection and separation, to large-scale painting that investigates cosmic natures. Gallery  8 continued to serve as the museum’s dedicated special exhibition space,hosting the exhibition Bochner Boetti Fontana from October 2, 2020 – April 5, 2021, curated by Mel Bochner in collaboration with Magazzino Italian Art. The exhibition examined parallel artistic movements in the 1960s and 1970s in the U.S. and Italy through the artwork of Bochner, Alighiero Boetti, and Lucio Fontana.

On May 8, 2021, Magazzino debuted Nivola: Sandscapes, a solo exhibition of Costantino Nivola’s pioneering sandcast reliefs, concrete sculptures, and rarely seen architectural maquettes. The exhibition was organized in collaboration with the Nivola Foundation and the Embassy of Italy in Washington D.C., providing a rare opportunity to explore the innovative techniques of the modernist sculptor.

From May 7, 2022- January 9, 2023, Magazzino’s special exhibition, Gilardi: Tappeto-Natura, marked the first solo museum exhibition in the United States for the Italian artist, Piero Gilardi, who throughout his career remained committed to investing in the formation of an international artistic community that embodied the tie between art and life. The exhibition focused on the works at the core of his practice, Tappeto-Natura, which translates to Nature Carpets, representing the culmination of his dream of an ideal nature, uncontaminated, “recreated” through an artificial material like polyurethane foam. The pieces, unframed and mounted on the floor and walls, embody the artist’s goal of facilitating a direct relationship between the viewer’s mind and the work.

Public programming 
Since the founding of Magazzino Italian Art, the institution hosted a range of exhibitions, large scale performative public art works and public educational programs. In 2017, Michelangelo Pistoletto staged a performance of Scultura da Passeggio (Walking Sculpture) in Cold Spring, New York. In 2019, artist Marinella Senatore and the School of Narrative Dance joined Magazzino for a community event in the Village of Cold Spring, New York, hosting a rolling parade of marches, performances, dancing and music on Main Street. In 2019, Magazzino partnered with Beacon, New York-based artist Melissa McGill to stage Red Regatta in Venice, Italy. This large scale public performance choreographed a fleet of traditional vela al terzo boats, rigged with sails in shades of red sailing across the Venetian lagoon in celebration of the city’s maritime history and sharing a cautionary tale about the effects of climate change and mass tourism on the region.

Magazzino’s public programs include a full range of artist talks, book presentations, concerts, films, scholarly lectures, and workshops that invite audiences to encounter new perspectives and aspects of Italian art and culture. Each spring, Magazzino’s Scholar-in-Residence curates a lecture series that invites leading scholars from around the world to present on topics relating to postwar and contemporary Italian art. Magazzino hosts Cinema in Piazza, an annual summer film program organized in collaboration with Artecinema and the Cold Spring Film Society. The event benefits the charity RxART, of which Founder Nancy Olnick is a member.

Research center 
In 2018, Magazzino Italian Art opened its research center and started its annual scholar-in-residence program. The Scholar-in-Residence program is a fellowship lasting 11 months,  inviting a recent PhD graduate to pursue an independent project that contributes new research in the field of postwar and contemporary Italian Art. In addition to their work, the scholar works closely with the museum team on providing their expertise on upcoming public programs, leading tours and curating a spring lecture series. Applicants can apply directly on the museum’s website. Previous recipients of the Scholar-in-Residence fellowship include Dr. Francesco Guzzetti, Dr. Tenley Bick, Dr. Teresa Kittler, and Dr. Katie Larson. 

The Research Center serves as a resource for scholars and students, open by appointment. It offers an extensive library and archive of publications on a wide array of subjects. Currently, the Research Center has over 5,000 publications, with 330 of those being rare book and archival material such as photographs, invitations, posters, and books; over twenty periodical subscriptions are also available.

In 2019, Magazzino appointed Melissa Dunn as its inaugural research center coordinator.

Architecture and design 
Magazzino Italian Art is 20,000 square feet, including 18,000 square feet of exhibition space, an interior courtyard, and nearly 5 acres of landscaped grounds.

The museum was created from a pre-existing warehouse off Route 9 in Cold Spring, New York by Spanish architect Miguel Quismondo. The concept of a warehouse is central to the space’s identity: one of the structures, built in 1964, functioned for years as a storage facility for a computer manufacturer and, before that, as a distribution center for dairy products. The name alludes to the industrial spaces that served as the backdrop of Arte Povera, and paid homage by Quismondo through his selection of building materials, such as steel and cement. Quismondo started the design project by repairing and refurbishing the original steel-and-concrete 11,000-square-foot, L-shaped building located off Route 9, at the low point of a rolling landscape, adjacent to protected wetlands. 

He adapted the structure to include a library, restrooms, and several distinct galleries. The design team removed the building’s drop ceilings and discovered steel joists and a roof of precast-concrete panels. They decided to expose these existing elements. Rather than obstructing them with the HVAC system, the team tore up the floor slab and installed a radiant heating and cooling system, which is also used in the new building. Large, square windows and a series of skylights installed to bring daylight into the space. The exterior was refinished in a smooth, white stucco. For the new structure, he designed a 14,000-square-foot rectangular building made up of a poured-in-place concrete frame. The addition runs parallel to the  existing building, closing the L-shape with a glass passageway to form a central courtyard. The addition includes gallery space on the ground level and offices and storage in the basement. The old and new volumes come together in a harmony of material and scale.

Magazzino Italian Art was architect Miguel Quismondo’s first major completed project. He previously worked under Alberto Campo Baeza on the Olnick Spanu House in Garrison, New York. Quismondo became involved with Magazzino in 2014, but completed construction (doubling as the general contractor) in 20 months. 

Architects Miguel Quismondo and Albert Campo Baeza are collaborating for the first time on an additional building for Magazzino, set to open in 2023, offering much-needed gallery, educational and programming space. The Robert Olnick Pavillion, named after Founder Nancy Olnick's late father, is nestled into the hillside perpendicular to the original building, taking advantage of its surroundings and coming equipped with a multi-purpose room, Education Department, a cafe and bookstore, and two new galleries.

Awards 
2018 AIANY Design Awards

Honorable Mention 2018 AN Best of Design Award for Cultural Space

Runner Up 2018 Building of The Year Award by American-Architects

Longlisted Dezeen Awards 2019 Architecture

Dedalo Minosse International Prize, Regione del Veneto Special Award 2019

Landscape 
Magazzino Italian Art is located in Cold Spring, New York, a town in the Hudson Valley region. The museum is about 60 miles north of New York City.

Magazzino is surrounded by landscaped grounds with seasonal flora and fauna. The museum also has Sardinian donkey stables on the premises. The donkeys joined the museum in 2017, serving as a mascot for the museum and a symbol of community between Italy and the region; Nancy Olnick and Giorgio Spanu, the founders of Magazzino Italian Art, donated two donkeys to Tilly Foster Farms for education purposes and for the public to view.  

Magazzino also hosts a variety of outdoor installations, both permanent and temporary. From Memorial Day Weekend until September 14, 2021, the installation by artist Bruna Esposito, Alrti Venti – Ostro (2020), was on view. The artwork built on the artist's four-decade commitment to sustainability by questioning the ubiquitous use of air conditioners to manipulate our environment, featuring a wooden structure and bench. In Fall 2021, a commissioned sculpture joined the donkey herd, Namsal Siedlecki’s Trevis Maponos, an installation featuring a concrete base and hay feeder, used daily by Magazzino’s donkeys. Italian artist Renato Leotta’s work, Notte di San Lorenzo (New York City), debuted on Magazzino’s grounds in 2019. This site-specific installation connected the artist’s lemon grove in Sicily, a continuing source of inspiration for his work, to the bucolic Cold Spring landscape, the Hudson River and New York City.

Reception 

Magazzino Italian Art opened in 2017 to a warm reception from the local, national and international arts communities.

Magazzino Italian Art’s building has been described as harmonious and praised as “a lesson in expert proportion,” by Alex Kimoski in Architectural Record.

The interior galleries have been described as an elegant and sleek home for masterworks of the Arte Povera movement. After visiting the museum’s inaugural exhibition, New York Times’ Nancy Princenthal writes: “But as Magazzino confirms, by its design aesthetic as much as by its inaugural show — it honors Margherita Stein, a patron of the movement — an irrepressible sense of good taste prevailed from the start.”

Initial reviews of Magazzino remarked about the evident scholarly rigor and substance of the exhibitions and curatorial programs. Clayton Press writes, “The selection of works at Magazzino presents a cohesive, clear overview of Arte Povera and its Italian contemporary art descendants.”

Siddhartha Mitter for the Village Voice described his experience of the artworks on view as “transcendent” and exemplary of “Arte Povera at its finest: raw yet peaceful, industrial yet sensory, a passageway for the ghosts in the machine.”

Since opening, the museum has provided a cultural hub for the region and beyond.

In 2020, following COVID-19 related closures, the museum reopened with two exhibitions: ongoing Arte Povera and Homemade. The museum’s COVID-19 safety protocols were featured and celebrated broadly by the museum community. Magazzino Italian Art was the first museum in the United States to adopt a new social distancing technology, the EGOpro Active Tags.

References 

Art museums and galleries in New York (state)
Arte Povera